Krall may refer to:

People
 Diana Krall (born 1964), Canadian jazz pianist and singer
 Hanna Krall (born 1935), Polish writer
 Johann Baptist Krall (1803–1883), Austrian composer, conductor, and music editor/arranger
 Lance Krall (born 1970), American comedian and actor, television writer, director, and producer of Vietnamese descent
 Yung Krall (born 1946), American former spy born in Vietnam

Other
 Krall, a villain from the 2016 film Star Trek Beyond
 The Lance Krall Show, a 30-minute comedy television show featuring sketches and on-the-street interaction

ja:クラール